List of Serbian films encompasses films produced by the Cinema of Serbia. Serbia  again became an independent country in 2006, after the dissolution of Serbia and Montenegro.

For an A-Z list see :Category:Serbian films

1900s

1910s

1920s

1930s

1940s

1990s

2000s

2010s

2020s

See also 
 Lists of Yugoslav films

References

External links
 Serbian film at the Internet Movie Database